Hahnia pusio, is a species of spider of the genus Hahnia. It is endemic to Sri Lanka.

See also
 List of Hahniidae species

References

Hahniidae
Endemic fauna of Sri Lanka
Spiders of Asia
Spiders described in 1898